Muhammad Jalaluddin Sayeed was a Pakistani maritime sailor and industry veteran who was the founding director of Neptune Orient Lines (NOL), a Singapore-based shipping company. He had vast experience as a maritime sailor.

Biography

Early life
Sayeed was born in December 1920 in Hyderabad Deccan. His father Dr Lateef Sayeed was the  secretary of the Indian National Congress of Hyderabad state, a journalist, and friend to Rabindranath Tagore, to the Nizam of Hyderabad, to Mohandas Karamchand Gandhi and to Jawaharlal Nehru. Syed Mohammad Ahsan, the Chief of Naval Staff of the Pakistan Navy from 1966 to 1969, was his first cousin.

Professional career
In 1939, Sayeed signed on Jalapadma, a converted cargo vessel, owned by the Scindia Steam Navigation Company. 
In 1947, Sayeed qualified as a Master in London. He returned to Bombay to help organize the Maritime Union of India. 
In 1952, went back to London to study for his Extra Master Mariner’s certificate. 
In 1953, after getting his certificate, he returned to the sea until 1956 when he came ashore to stay. He later joined Karachi's National Shipping Corporation as a marine superintendent in 1960, and worked his way up to become the commercial manager.

Building Singapore maritime industry
In 1968, the Singapore government requested the government of Pakistan for an expert to advise them on the formation of a shipping company. Sayeed was chosen for this task by the Pakistan, which the Pakistan National Shipping Corporation agreed to as well. In Singapore, Sayeed formed Neptune Orient Lines (NOL) in 1969 and worked there until 1973. At the time of his departure, the then Prime Minister, Lee Kuan Yew, wrote him the following farewell letter.

“Thank you for your letter of September 7 telling me that you have decided to return to Pakistan. May I sincerely thank you for having helped NOL get on its feet. Your services were invaluable. Thank you for the kind and generous compliments you have paid to the people of Singapore, and for your good wishes to my wife, children and me. May I wish you an interesting and rewarding future as you move to new challenges. For a person of your years to find the time and interest in-between your duties to be able to write a note to me in Chinese demonstrates the triumph of an inquisitive mind and an indomitable spirit over hard challenges.”

During his career at NOL, Goh Chok Tong worked as a financial controller under him in NOL. After his death, Goh sent the following message to his wife Zareena

"Captain Sayeed laid the keel for NOL and built it up into a reputable international line for which Singapore will always be grateful. None of us had ever run a shipping line and Captain Sayeed was patient in teaching us the ropes..."

Legacy
In 2006, NOL established Scholarship is in memory of the late Muhammad Jalaluddin Sayeed for Master of Science in Maritime Studies jointly offered at Nanyang Technological University and Norwegian School of Management.

In NOL's own word, "It (the scholarship) recognises Sayeed's pioneering spirit and his contributions to NOL and the maritime industry in Singapore."

Personal life
Jalaluddin married Zareena Sayeed, and have 4 daughters, Mahjabeen, Nazneen, Lubna and Fatima. He is also first cousin of Syed Mohammad Ahsan.

See also
 Pakistanis in Singapore
 Pakistan – Singapore relations

References 

1920 births
2005 deaths
Pakistani sailors
Pakistani expatriates in Singapore
Year of death missing
Businesspeople from Karachi
Pakistani people of Hyderabadi descent
Pakistani company founders
Indian emigrants to Pakistan